Tripylella muscusi is a species of nematodes, first found in Mexico. It can be distinguished by its body length (averaging ); its pharynx and tail lengths; its possession of an excretory pore; exhibiting body pores and scant somatic setae; a striated cuticle carrying sparse anastomoses; as well as protruding vulval lips, among other characteristics.

References 

Enoplia